Botanical sexism is a term coined by horticulturist Tom Ogren to describe the planting of male plants instead of female plants of certain dioecious species including: willows, poplars, aspens, ashes, silver maples, pistache, mulberry, pepper tree and other woody plants such as junipers, yew pines,  fern pines, wax myrtles, alpine currants, plum yews, and yews   According to Ogren, pollen allergies have been amplified due to the planting in urban areas of male clones which increases the amount of pollen in the air. Male plants are commonly used in urban areas because plants with female flowers produce fruits and flowers that litter the landscape. The planting of more female plants would decrease the overall amount of pollen since they do not produce pollen and remove pollen from the air for pollination. The theory has existed since at least the 2000s. Biological sexism is used in the Ogren Plant Allergy Scale (OPALS), which has been adopted by the United States Department of Agriculture. Botanical sexism has found some scientific acceptance as a reason for increased allergies and asthma; however, other scientists have also been critical of it, stating that it only applies to certain trees and is not as widespread as Ogren alleges.

References

Allergology